XHLQ-FM/XELQ-AM is a radio station on 90.1 FM and 570 AM in Morelia, Michoacán. It is owned by Cadena RASA and carries its Candela grupera format.

History
XELQ-AM 570 received its concession on November 11, 1952.

XELQ was cleared to move to FM in 2012, but it was required to maintain its AM station, as communities could lose radio service were the AM station to go off the air.

References

Radio stations in Michoacán
Radio stations in Mexico with continuity obligations